39 The Shambles is an historic building in the English city of York, North Yorkshire. Grade II* listed, part of the structure dates to the late 15th century, with an extension added in the late 17th century, followed by a remodelling in the early 19th century.

References 

39
Houses in North Yorkshire
Buildings and structures in North Yorkshire
15th-century establishments in England
Grade II* listed buildings in York
Grade II* listed houses
15th century in York